George Joseph Youill (2 October 1871 – 21 December 1936) was an Australian cricketer. He was a right-handed batsman. He played 14 first-class cricket matches for New South Wales between 1889 and 1896, scoring 372 runs.

See also
 List of New South Wales representative cricketers

References

External links
 

1871 births
1936 deaths
Australian cricketers
New South Wales cricketers
Sportsmen from New South Wales